Psorosa nucleolella is a species of snout moth. It is found in Finland, Russia, Ukraine, Kazakhstan and Mongolia.

The wingspan is 17–19 mm.

References

Moths described in 1866
Phycitini
Moths of Europe
Moths of Asia